Socialist China may refer to:
 
People's Republic of China
China Democratic Socialist Party, a former political party in the Republic of China
Chinese Communist Party
Socialism with Chinese characteristics
Socialist ideology of the Kuomintang
Ideology of the Chinese Communist Party
Core Socialist Values